Calanus hyperboreus is a copepod found in the Arctic and northern Atlantic.

Description
The antennae are longer or of equal length to the body. This copepod is very clear, and is generally colourless. The gut walls and posterior may be orange to dark red in colour, with a prominent lipid sac that is usually red-orange. The borders between segments have a deep red pigment.

Distribution
Calanus hyperboreus is found in the Arctic, north of the Bering Strait in the Pacific and the Lofoten Islands in the Atlantic.

Ecology

Reproduction and life-cycle
This copepod spawns between October and March (winter), using lipid-reserves to fuel reproduction (making it a capital breeder).

Life spans from one to two years to four to six years have been suggested for C. hyperboreus based on food availability. After the plankton bloom, the eggs develop into stage II and III copepodites and feed actively near the surface from May to October (summer). After overwintering again, they grow to stage V during the next summer, increasing their dry mass by a factor of seven, and expanding their lipid content to be more than 65% of their dry mass. The development into an adult occurs over another winter, after which C. hyperboreus breeds. During this winter, some mature females are found near the surface. This shows a life cycle of three years (in the case of the male, which is not found during the summer) and three to four years (for the female). In other areas, like the Greenland Sea Gyre, development into adults may occur in the second year of development, indicating a likely life cycle of two to three years.

Compared to the congeneric C. finmarchicus, C. hyperboreus has a higher concentration of lipids as a percentage of dry mass. Additionally, its lipid stores have a higher concentration of wax esters than C. finmarchicus and C. glacialis. C. hyperboreus also has longer chained fatty alcohols and (albeit to a lesser extent) fatty acids than the two other species. This is likely due to the higher concentration of energy per unit mass of longer chained fatty alcohols and acids. Finally, this species also has higher concentrations of polyunsaturated fatty acids than either C. finmarchicus or C. glacialis.

Feeding
This species is a herbivore and a filter feeder, feeding on phytoplankton and protists, especially diatoms.

References

Calanoida
Crustaceans of the Atlantic Ocean
Fauna of the Arctic Ocean
Crustaceans of the Pacific Ocean
Crustaceans described in 1838
Taxa named by Henrik Nikolai Krøyer